Edward Kenneth Braxton (born June 28, 1944) is an American prelate of the Catholic Church who served as bishop of the Diocese of Belleville in Illinois, from 2005 to 2020.

Braxton previously served as an auxiliary bishop of the Archdiocese of St. Louis in Missouri during 1995 and as bishop of the Diocese of Lake Charles in Louisiana from 2000 to 2005.

Biography

Early years 
Braxton was born on June 28, 1944, in Chicago, Illinois, the son of Cullen L. Braxton Sr and Evelyn Braxton.

Braxton attended Archbishop Quigley Preparatory Seminary and Niles College Seminary, both in Chicago, then St. Mary of the Lake Seminary in Mundelein, Illinois.  He earned Bachelor, Master, Bachelor of Sacred Theology degree and a Licentiate in Sacred Theology. Before his ordination, Braxton served as a deacon for one year at St. Raymond De Penafort Parish in Mount Prospect, Illinois.

Priesthood 
On May 13, 1970, Braxton was ordained as a priest of the Archdiocese of Chicago by Cardinal John Cody.

In 1973, Braxton entered the Catholic University of Louvain in Belgium, earning a Ph.D. in Religious Studies and a Doctor of Sacred Theology degree in systematic theology summa cum laude.  While in Belgium, he ministered at US Armed Forces bases in the area and at Our Lady of Mercy Parish in Brussels.

After returning to Chicago, Braxton served as associate pastor of St. Felicitas Parish.  He also began a post doctoral fellowship at the Divinity School of the University of Chicago. In 1976, Braxton attended the Harvard University Divinity School in the William A. Coolidge Chair of Ecumenical Thought at Harvard for a year. During this time, he also performed pastoral duties at St. Paul’s Parish in Cambridge, Massachusetts.. The next year, Braxton became a visiting professor of theology at the University of Notre Dame.

In 1978, Braxton became the chancellor for theological affairs in the Diocese of Cleveland for then Bishop James A. Hickey. When Hickey became Archbishop of Washington D.C in 1980, Braxton became his special assistant for theological affairs  He was one of the first priests to be appointed to this type of collaborative work with a bishop on a full-time basis.

While in Washington, Braxton also worked in ministry at St. John the Baptist Parish in Silver Spring, Maryland. In 1983, Braxton became the scholar in residence at the Pontifical North American College in Rome.

After returning to Chicago in 1983, Braxton was named director of Calvert House, the Catholic Student Center at the University of Chicago, working there until 1986. In 1984, he  served as a peritus for the Symposium of Episcopal Conferences of Africa and Madagascar in Kinshasa, Zaire. In August 1985, Braxton addressed the 43rd International Eucharistic Congress in Nairobi, Kenya on "The Eucharist and the Catholic Family."

Braxton's writings have appeared in the Harvard Theological Review, Theological Studies, Irish Theological Quarterly, The New Catholic Encyclopedia, Origins, Commonweal, America, and National Catholic Reporter.

In 1986, Braxton became the official theological consultant in New York City to William H. Sadlier Inc., a  publisher of Catholic Religious Education books. While at Sadler, he performed pastoral duties at St. Joseph's Parish in Greenwich Village and at Notre Dame Parish at Columbia University.

In 1992, Braxton returned to Illinois to become pastor of St. Catherine of Siena Parish in Oak Park.  While at St. Catherine, Braxton stirred resentment by refusing to allow Sister Teresita Weind, a popular nun, to deliver homiles at Sunday mass. In August 1997, Braxton addressed the National Black Catholic Congress on the topic "Take Into account Various Situations and Cultures: Evangelization and African-Americans".

Auxiliary Bishop of St. Louis

Braxton was appointed an auxiliary bishop of the Archdiocese of Saint Louis and titular bishop of Macomades Rusticiana by Pope John Paul II on March 28, 1995. He was consecrated by Cardinal Justin Rigali on May 17, 1995 at the Cathedral Basilica of Saint Louis.

Bishop of Lake Charles

Braxton was appointed bishop of the Diocese of Lake Charles in Louisiana on December 12, 2000. He was installed on  February 22, 2001.

Bishop of Belleville, Illinois
In January 2005, Wilton Gregory, bishop of the Diocese of Belleville, Wilton Gregory, was appointed as Archbishop of Atlanta. Cardinal Francis George, then archbishop of Chicago, asked the priests and laity in the diocese for input on a new bishop to be forwarded to the Vatican, a customary procedure  However, before receiving any input, Pope John Paul II appointed Braxton on March 15, 2006, as bishop. In May 2005, 50 priests from the diocese signed a letter complaining about the selection process.  Cardinal George later said that the pope did not consult him either on the Braxton selection. Braxton was installed on June 22, 2005, as bishop of the Diocese of Belleville in the Cathedral of Saint Peter. He served as a member of USCCB's Committees on Education, Science and Human Values, and also of the committee on Scripture Translation.

In January 2006, 24 priests in the diocese signed a letter stating that Braxton was not allowing any of their input into decision-making and that he had an arrogant leadership style. On January 24, 2008, Braxton apologized for mishandling diocese funds.  He had used $18,000 that was supposed to go to the Society for the Propagation of the Faith to purchase vestments, altar linens, and office furniture.  Braxton said he had mistakenly believed he had discretionary power over these funds.

In February 2012, the Reverent William Rowe, pastor of Saint Mary's Church in Mount Carmel, Illinois, resigned from his post after Braxton expressed concern about "how Father Rowe celebrated the Mass". Following the implementation of the new English translation of the Roman Missal in late November 2011, Braxton had placed greater emphasis on following the translation exactly, but Braxton's concerns predated that translation's use, and "several meetings … over the last five years [had] failed to resolve the bishop's concerns."  "Several parishioners" had expressed dismay and furnished evidence about Rowe's celebration of the mass.  Rowe said "He mentioned in the letter that we clash in our ecclesiology — our image of the church. He’s right. He seems to consider the church as the bishops’, and my notion is that the church starts with the people.  Another priest also resigned after Rowe.

Retirement 
On April 3, 2020, Pope Francis accepted Braxton's letter of resignation as bishop of the Diocese of Belleville.  The Pope named Michael G. McGovern, a priest in the Archdiocese of Chicago, as Braxton's successor.

References

External links
 National Black Catholic Congress bio of Edward Braxton
 Diocesan biography
 Roman Catholic Diocese of Belleville
 Roman Catholic Diocese of Lake Charles Website
Edward Braxton, "We, too, sing America: The Catholic church and the Museum of African American History and Culture", National Catholic Reporter, February 6, 2017

1944 births
Living people
20th-century Roman Catholic bishops in the United States
21st-century Roman Catholic bishops in the United States
Clergy from Chicago
African-American Roman Catholic bishops
KU Leuven alumni
University of Saint Mary of the Lake alumni
American College of the Immaculate Conception alumni
Roman Catholic Archdiocese of St. Louis
Roman Catholic bishops of Belleville
Roman Catholic Ecclesiastical Province of New Orleans
21st-century African-American people
20th-century African-American people